The DaVinci International Film Festival (DIFF) is held annually in Los Angeles, California and is produced by the non-profit DaVinci Film Foundation Inc. The festival governs four signature programs including their screenwriting competition series STORYLINE, presented by Final Draft, the DaVinci Film Institute, which honors beurgeoning filmmakers with screenings and scholarships held at The Kennedy Center in Washington DC, sponsored by Coca-Cola, and documentaries at DIFFdocs.

DIFF operates quarterly, qualifying and awarding contemporary independent narrative. short, animation, and documentary film projects and screenplay's at STORYLINE, with their Vitruvian Awards. Vitruvian filmmakers and screenwriters remain in competition for the festival's Leo Award, presented at their annual event. Competitive juried categories include Women In Film, Native American, military, and student film.

Special screenings for DIFF's Vitruvian VIP's have included the Consul (representative) of Azerbaijan, Monaco, India, and Russia.

History 
The DaVinci International Film Festival was founded in 2017 by filmmaker and Creative Director Chadwick Pelletier.. DIFF's inaugural festival was hosted at the historic Laemmle Theaters in Santa Monica, California on May 17, 2018 and was awarded FilmFreeway's Top 100 Best Reviewed film festival, screening Tracktown starring Olympic athlete, Alexi Pappas, Money, starring Jesse Williams (actor), Rumble: The Indians Who Rocked the World, and Honor Council, written and directed by Nicholl Fellowships in Screenwriting winner, Scott Simonsen.

DIFF hosted its 2019 Vitruvian Awards at Raleigh Studios in Hollywood, California, expanding its award categories to include documentary filmmaking under DIFFdocs and awarding its first Leo Award to documentarian, Herbert Golder for his film Ballad of a Righteous Merchant starring Werner Herzog, William Dafoe, and Michael Shannon. Other winning films in the narrative category included Aberne by Irati Santiago Mujika and I'm F%$#ing Fine by writer-director Jamie Anderson, starring Bree Turner.

DaVinci International Film Festival's third annual Vitruvian Awards were hosted online as a virtual fest, September 10-13th, 2020 due to the COVID-19 pandemic. Among the Vitruvian Awarded films were The Cuban, Anna, Birds of Passage (film), Bluebird, and Mosul (2019 action film). DIFF's Leo Award in the animation category went to Malakout, directed by Farnooshh Abedi. Also in 2020, the DaVinci International Film festival introduced an all-new Ultra-Short Shelter-in-place program called COVIDaVINCI, which opened entries to amateur filmmakers around the world for an opportunity to be screened at DIFF's virtual festival. In 2022, the festival rebranded the ultra-short program as GENiUS. 

Due to the SARS-CoV-2 Delta variant, DaVinci International Film Festival hosted its 4th Edition Vitruvian Awards online, October 10-15, 2021. Leo Award winners included The Last Tour by director Douglas Pedro Sánchez, The Criminals in the narrative short film category, which also won the Special Jury Award for screenwriting at Sundance Film Festival, Max Steiner: Maestro of Movie Magic, Iara Lee's short documentary From Trash to Treasure: Turning Negatives into Positives, and GON: The Little Fox for best animation film by Japan director, Takeshi Yashiro.

DaVinci International Film Festival's 5th Edition in partnership with AMC Theatres at The Grove at Farmers Market was held September 24-25, 2022. In addition to its regular programming, the festival introduced all-new panel events including Film Canada presented by industry leader, William F. White International and Digital Hollywood, which invited actor and Executive Producer, Aleks Paunovic and business partner, Neil Stevenson-Moore to discuss NFT's, blockchain, and how the new tech is disrupting Hollywood traditional financial systems. Founder and President, Chadwick Pelletier presented DIFF's first-ever Honorary Leo Award to Destination Angels, a multi-media Jack Kerouac Centennial documentary event, directed by Daniel Lir and produced by Grammy Award winning musical artist, Dru DeCaro. Among some of the titles in competition were Sylvester Stallone's MVP. New Zealand'sThe Justice of Bunny King (Leo Award Winner), a Valerie Perrine documentary, and Tough Ain't Enough, which documents two-time Academy Award winning producer, Albert S. Ruddy and his work on such films as Hogan's Heroes, The Godfather, and Million Dollar Baby, among others.

Awards 
DaVinci International Film Festival honors independent filmmakers and screenwriters with quarterly and annual awards.

Vitruvian Award 
Named after Leonardo da Vinci's Vitruvian Man, DIFF's Vitruvian Award is given to quarterly winners in narrative, animation, documentary, and screenwriting categories. DIFF discontinued the quarterly award in 2019.

Leo Award 
DIFF's Leonardo da Vinci bust statue is awarded to Best of Fest in each category and is the highest honor at the international film festival.

Honorary 
Each year, the DaVinci International Film Festival's Board of Directors honors special achievements in independent film and philanthropy. Among the recipients include CEO and Entrepreneur, Andy Khawaja of Allied Wallet and director, Daniel Lir for his Jack Kerouac Centennial documentary, Destination Angeles.

Organization
The festival has a presence in both the United States and in Europe, and is currently operated by Founder and CEO, Chadwick Pelletier and the NPO's Board of Directors. The festival's international Advisory Board representatives are located in France and Monaco.

Non-profit and Mission 
DaVinci Film Foundation Inc. was recognized as a registered 501(c)3 nonprofit in 2019 with a Mission Statement aimed to cultivate and honor independent Creatives across multiple disciplines in the arts and sciences. According to Pelletier: "DIFF's format was largely modeled after the luminary, Leonardo da Vinci, hence the name," he said. "Our goal at DIFF is to honor the independent creative -- across domains -- and celebrate divergent and meaningful Works with a long-term objective to create a competitive and boutique version of Venice Biennale,” he concluded.

References

External links
 DaVinci International Film Festival

Film festivals in Los Angeles
Short film festivals in the United States